The Battle of Bosco Marengo (aka Battle of Frascata)  was fought in the autumn of 1447.

The Duke of Orleans, Charles I, son of Valentina Visconti, laid claim to the Duchy of Milan and dispatched an army from the Dauphiné and Lyonais under Renaud du Dresnay into Lombardy. The Golden Ambrosian Republic responded and dispatched a total of 3,700 troops under Colleoni to Alessandria. At Bosco Marengo, battle was joined and the French suffered a complete defeat with their general Renaud du Dresnay being captured and later ransomed for 14,000 'couronnes'.

Sources

Battles involving the Duchy of Milan
1447 in Europe
1440s in the Holy Roman Empire
15th century in Italy
Conflicts in 1447
Battles involving France
Bosco Marengo